Sayf al-Dīn ‘Uṭayfah ibn Muḥammad Abī Numayy al-Ḥasanī was an Emir of Mecca. He died in Egypt in 743 AH (1342/1343).

Notes

References

Emirs
 
Banu Qatadah
14th-century Arabs